Dr. Fernando E. Franca (May 28, 1925- July 1, 1992) was an explorer, physician, airplane pilot and an inventor.

Fernando Estanislao Franca Martínez was born in Havana, Cuba in 1925 to Dr. Fernando Franca Reguéira a physician, and Marina Martínez Barreto. He was the younger of 2 children. His older sister Olga Franca Martínez (married Sherwood Wolfer) was a lawyer. Dr. Franca was the cousin of economist Porfirio Franca y Álvarez de la Campa who was a President of the Cuban Republic under the Pentarchy of 1933. Dr. Franca's uncle was physicist-mathematician Pablo Miquel Merino, a colleague and collaborator of Albert Einstein and the founder of the Society of Cuban Physics and Mathematics Sciences.

In the late 1940s and early 1950s, Franca hosted a number of nightclubs and cabarets located in Old Havana and in Havana's Chinatown.

In 1950 Dr. Franca married Julia Maria Velasco Morin. They had a son Fernando Ramon Franca formerly a fashion designer in New York City and later an interior designer in Fort Lauderdale, Florida. Their marriage ended in divorce in 1953. 

In 1955 Dr. Franca married Eva Quesada Condis in Havana, to whom he remained married until his death in 1992. They had 2 sons both born in Havana: Frank Franca a photographer in New York City, and Eduardo Franca a Medical Doctor in Miami.

Dr. Franca held Medical Doctorates from the University of Havana, Cuba; The University of Salamanca, Spain, and The University of Miami, US. He was also a graduate of Belen Jesuit College in Havana, where one of his classmates was Fidel Castro.

Among his many interests, Franca was an inventor, notably of medical and surgical instruments designed to ease the work of surgeons performing delicate surgical procedures.

Franca Glacier in Antarctica is named in honor of Franca for his work in the Antarctic:

In 1973 and 1974, Dr, Franca served as the Medical Officer and Station Manager of Palmer Station in Antarctica. Palmer Station is an American scientific research center for the study of marine biology. The station also houses year-round monitoring equipment for global seismic, atmospheric, and UV-monitoring networks, as well as a site for the study of heliophysics. Palmer also hosts a radio receiver that studies lightning over the Western Hemisphere. 
Franca Glacier  is a glacier in Antarctica, flowing northeast into the head of Solberg Inlet, Bowman Coast, to the south of Houser Peak. The glacier was photographed from the air by the United States Antarctic Service, 1940, and the U.S. Navy, 1966. It was surveyed by the Falkland Islands Dependencies Survey, 1946–48, and named by the Advisory Committee on Antarctic Names in 1977 after Fernando E. Franca, Medical Officer and Station Manager, Palmer Station, 1974.

References

1925 births
1992 deaths
University of Salamanca alumni
University of Miami alumni
Cuban expatriates in Spain
Cuban expatriates in the United States
Cuban physicians
Explorers